Sir Zar (also Romanized as Sīr Zār; also known as Sirza) is a village in Pasakuh Rural District, Zavin District, Kalat County, Razavi Khorasan Province, Iran. At the 2006 census, its population was 57, in 12 families.

References 

Populated places in Kalat County